Danesfort is a County Kilkenny based Gaelic Athletic Association club that competes in the Kilkenny Senior Championship. The club's grounds are located about 4 miles south of Kilkenny city on the Waterford Road.  

The club was founded in 1922 and incorporates a broad area south of Kilkenny city, encompassing Danesfort itself as well as Burnchurch, Cuffesgrange and part of Kells. The club borders rival clubs Bennetsbridge to the east, Graigue-Ballycallan to the west, Carrickshock and Dunnamaggin to the south and city club James Stephens to the north.

Current Chairman of the Club is Finbarr Kelly. Other important Club delegates include Secretary Michael J Moylan, Treasurer Helen Devane and PRO Ursula Mahony.

All-Ireland success
Danesfort completed a mammoth season in 2006/07 by capturing the Kilkenny Junior Hurling Championship, Leinster Junior Club Hurling Championship and All-Ireland Junior Club Hurling Championship defeating Clooney Gaels of Antrim in the final in Croke Park.

Captain of the team that season was Tony Woodcock. Other important players that season included the Hogan brothers, Paddy and Richie, Thomas Ryan and Paul Murphy.

Achievements
 All-Ireland Junior Club Hurling Championship Winners 2007
 Leinster Junior Club Hurling Championship Winners 2006
 Kilkenny Intermediate Hurling Championship Winners 1931, 2011
 Kilkenny Junior Hurling Championship Winners 1925, 1930, 2006

Notable players
 Jim Brophy
 Mick Brophy
 Paddy Hogan
 Richie Hogan
 Paul Murphy
 Philip Cooney

References

External links
Complete Roll of Honour Available Here 
Danesfort and Kilworth set for battle royale to make final

Gaelic games clubs in County Kilkenny